His Majesty's Armed Forces (HMAF) is the military of Tonga. It is composed of three operational components and two support elements (logistics and training groups).

The mission of HMAF is to: "Defend the sovereignty of the Kingdom of Tonga".

The HMAF is partially supported by defence co-operation agreements with Australia, the United States, China, India and New Zealand. The co-operation aims at capacity development through training of HMAF personnel in leadership, academic and trades while support for infrastructure development is another part of the security co-operation.

In recent years, members of HMAF have supported Coalition of the Willing in Operation Iraqi Freedom, the International Security Assistance Force in Afghanistan, and the Regional Assistance Mission to the Solomon Islands.

History

Tonga participated in World War I, as part of the New Zealand Expeditionary Force.

The Tonga Defence Service (TDS) came into existence at the beginning of World War II in 1939. In 1943, New Zealand helped train two Tongan contingents of two thousand personnel who fought in the Solomon Islands Campaign. In addition, New Zealand and US troops were stationed on Tongatapu, which became a staging point for shipping.

At the end of World War II, the TDS was disbanded, but was re-formed in 1946.

Former Prime Minister Prince Lavaka Ata 'Ulukalala (now King Tupou VI) joined the naval arm of the Tonga Defence Service in 1982 and became Lieutenant-Commander of the defence force in 1987. From 1990 to 1995 he commanded the PPB VOEA Pangai and his time in charge included peacekeeping operations in Bougainville.

In 2002, TDS soldiers were deployed as part of a multi-national regional peacekeeping force in the Solomon Islands. In July 2004, a forty-five personnel contingent of the TDS served in the Solomon Islands. A third contingent was sent in July 2005. This contingent consisted of thirty-three TDS troops, and was expected to remain four months.

In March 2003, military-to-military talks began between Tonga and the United States about Tonga providing personnel for the Multinational force in Iraq. Support arrangements were finalised in May 2004. Forty-five Royal Tongan Marines, led by the Chief of Defence of the Tonga Defence Services, Colonel Tau'aika 'Uta'atu, departed Tonga on 13 June 2004. From July 2004, the Royal Tonga Marines were augmenting the 1st Marine Expeditionary Forces (MEF) in the Al Anbar Province of Iraq. The Royal Marines supported the 1st Marine Division's security and stabilisation mission at Camp Blue Diamond. Tonga first served with the 1st MEF on the Solomon Island during World War II. The Royal Tongan Marines returned from Iraq in December 2004. In December 2008, the Tonga Defence Services ended their mission in the Iraq War and returned home.

In 2006, TDS soldiers, in co-operation with local police, were deployed to deal with the Nuku'alofa riots.

In 2010, Tongan troops began training with the RAF Regiment, in preparation for operations in Afghanistan; the first troops deployed to Afghanistan during February 2011. Tonga's military size was approximately 450 troops, half of which were sent to fight in the War in Afghanistan, serving in Camp Bastion and Camp Leatherneck. During the September 2012 Camp Bastion raid Tonga troops were in perimeter guard towers without any night-vision devices. In September 2013, Tonga Defence Services were officially renamed into His Majesty's Armed Forces (HMAF). In April 2014, the Royal Tongan Marines ended their mission supporting Operation Enduring Freedom in Afghanistan.

Components

The main elements of HMAF are:
His Majesty's Armed Forces HQ
Joint Force HQ
Land Force
Tongan Royal Guards
Royal Tongan Marines
Combined Logistics and Technical Support
Tongan Navy
Training Command
Air Wing
Support Unit
Territorial Forces

Tongan Maritime Force (Tongan Navy)

The Maritime Force is equipped with three Pacific-class patrol boats, a tanker, a Landing Craft Mechanised and a motor boat that is the royal yacht. Tongan Maritime Force performs patrol missions, occasionally dealing with border violations, at the Minerva Reef and Tonga's restricted fishing zones.

Royal Tongan Marines 
The Royal Tongan Marine Infantry is organised as a single battalion with a HQ and three Light Infantry Companies.

Tongan Royal Guards 
The Tongan Royal Guards are a company size unit that are responsible for the security of His Majesty. The Royal Guard maintains a musical unit known as the Tonga Royal Corps of Musicians that serves as a military band for different occasions.

Tongan Air Wing
The Air Wing was established in 1996 and operates one Beechcraft G.18S aircraft in the maritime patrol and search and rescue roles, and an American Champion Citabria light trainer. The current position of the HMAF air wing is unclear but both aircraft have not been active.

Retired Aircraft
 Victa Airtourer 1 aircraft.

International Defence Organisations

The HMAF is a member of the following international defence organisations:
 Pacific Armies Management Seminar
 Pacific Area Senior Officers Logistics Seminar
 Western Pacific Naval Symposium
 International Hydrographic Organization
 South Pacific Hydrographic Commission
 NATO Codification, where though Pacific Codification System, Tonga and Fiji are sponsored by Australia

Tonga has an agreement to share "disaster response knowledge" with the United States Nevada National Guard.

Ranks

The ranks used by His Majesty's Armed Forces are similar to those used in other Commonwealth armed forces.

Commissioned officer ranks
The rank insignia of commissioned officers.

Other ranks
The rank insignia of non-commissioned officers and enlisted personnel.

List of commanders

Equipment of His Majesty's Armed Forces

Small arms

Vehicles

References

External links

 
 Royal Tongan Marines are Camp Blue Diamond (Photo)
 US Department of State Background Note: Tonga
 Ted Harris, "Digger History - An unofficial history of the Australian &  New Zealand  Armed Services", 2004

Military of Tonga
Military units and formations of the British Empire
Tonga and the Commonwealth of Nations

de:Tonga#Außenpolitik